Nora V. Demleitner (born 1966) is the President of St. John's College - Annapolis (2022–present).   Prior to this she served as the Dean of Washington and Lee University School of Law from 2012-2015 and Dean of Hofstra University School of Law from 2007-2012.

Early life, education, and politics 
A native of Germany, Demleitner earned a B.A. degree summa cum laude from Bates College in 1989 and a J.D. degree in 1992 from Yale Law School, where she served as symposium editor of the Yale Law Journal.  She also earned a master's degree in international and comparative law from Georgetown University Law Center in 1994.

From 1992 until 1993, Demleitner worked as a law clerk for then-United States Court of Appeals for the Third Circuit Judge—and future U.S. Supreme Court Associate Justice—Samuel Alito.
Demleitner is a self-described Democrat who supports abortion rights and LGBT equality.

Professional career 
In 1994, Demleitner became a professor at St. Mary's University School of Law in San Antonio, Texas, at the age of 27.  She earned tenure in 1998 upon her earliest eligibility. In the fall of 1999, Demleitner worked as a visiting professor of law at the University of Michigan Law School. Demleitner joined the faculty of the Hofstra University School of Law in 2001 and served as vice dean from 2006 through 2007 and dean from 2007 through 2012.  In 2011, the school was renamed the Maurice A. Deane School of Law at Hofstra University in honor of a generous alumnus who made a $20 million commitment to the school.  Demleitner served as dean of Washington and Lee University School of Law from 2012 through 2015, during which time the school completed its $35 million capital campaign, renovated the law school building, Lewis Hall, and substantially increased the graduate employment and bar passage rates and diversity of the student body. Demleitner is a member of the American Law Institute and a Fellow of the European Law Institute. She stepped down as dean of Washington and Lee's School of Law at the end of the 2015 academic year and became a member of the faculty at W&L holding the Roy L. Steinheimer, Jr. Chair.  She is an author of Sentencing Law and Policy, a major casebook on sentencing law, and teaches and writes widely in the areas of criminal, comparative, and immigration law.  She is a member of the board of directors of the Prison Policy Initiative. Nora Demleitner testified "enthusiastically" on behalf of Samuel Alito at his Supreme Court confirmation hearing, calling Alito her role model.

2009 Supreme Court of the United States vacancy 
On May 17, 2009, National Public Radio legal affairs correspondent Nina Totenberg speculated that Demleitner might be among  a list of potential nominees being considered by President Obama to replace David Souter who "have gotten little or no attention" by the media.  "I was very surprised that NPR mentioned me," Demleitner told Newsday.  "It's an incredible honor to be mentioned."  Demleitner also told told Newsday, however, that she had not been contacted by anyone from the Obama administration.

See also
 Barack Obama Supreme Court candidates

References

External links

1966 births
American lawyers
American women lawyers
Bates College alumni
Deans of law schools in the United States
Women deans (academic)
Living people
Yale Law School alumni
Washington and Lee University School of Law faculty
German academic administrators
Women legal scholars